Hawkesbury Cricket Club is a cricket club based in the City of Hawkesbury, New South Wales, Australia. Nicknamed the Hawks. Inaugurated in 1985. Their home grounds of Owen Earle Oval and Bensons Lane Complex, which includes all 3 grade grounds, are among the best wickets in the Sydney Grade competition. The main oval has recently been upgraded with a new picket fence. Notable players: Stephen O'Keefe (NSW & Aust), Peter Forrest (NSW, QLD & Aust), John Hastings (Vic & Aust), Scott Henry (NSW), Anthony Kershler (NSW), and Shane Mott. Hawkesbury also produce regular members of NSW under-17 and 19 teams.

See also

References

External links

Sydney Grade Cricket clubs
Cricket clubs established in 1894
1894 establishments in Australia